Hidden Faces is a 2015 Hong Kong medical drama series produced by Hong Kong Television Network. The first episode premiered on 24 July 2015.

Cast 
 Frankie Lam as Dr. Jack Cheuk, plastic surgeon
 David Chiang as Dr. Chui Chun-pong, family physician
 Wilson Tsui as Dr. Chan Pun-yuen, gynecologist
 Kate Yeung as Amber / Jodie / Phoenix
 Leanne Ho as Hui Wai-sum, nurse
 Lesley Chiang as Chui Man-yee, Dr. Chui Chun-pong's daughter
 Sam Chan as Lam Chi-ho
 Rain Lau as Chiu Choi-king, works as a waitress in Cha chaan teng
 Philip Keung as Ma Sai-kwong, Chiu Choi-king's husband
 Maria Chen as Kimmy Kam
 Queenie Chan as Regina Chung
 Benji Chiang as Avery Chow, Hui Wai-sum's husband
 Rachel Lam as Kelly, personal assistant for Dr. Jack Cheuk
 Karen Lee as Sammi, nurse
 Yetta Tse as Lau Ming-chu, nurse
 Deon Cheung as Tin Jun
 Carlos Chan as Kenny
 Yan Ng as Liu Ho-yan, Yeung Chiu-hung's wife
 Wong Kwun-bun as Yeung Chiu-hung, part of Comprehensive Social Security Assistance
 Jackeline Cheung as Sophia, Dr. Chan Pun-yuen's wife
 Candy Cheung as Abby
 Jel Lam as Alice
 Jacky Yeung as Ben
 Eddie Li as Fong Chun-wai
 Bryant Mak as Frankie
 Carlos Koo as Arthur
 Jan Tse as waitress

Release
A 9-minute preview was released on HKTV's YouTube channel on 15 July 2015.

References

External links
 Official website

Hong Kong Television Network original programming
2015 Hong Kong television series debuts
2010s Hong Kong television series